Stevens–Dorn Farmstead, also known as the Peter M. Dorn Homeplace, is a historic home and farmstead located near Saluda, Saluda County, South Carolina.  The house was built in three phases between 1880 and 1900, and is a one-story, rectangular, frame dwelling. The house consists of 1 1/2 rooms, with three major front doors and one minor front door.  Also on the property are a contributing woodshed/buggy house, smokehouse, corn crib, and barn, all built about 1880; and three brooder houses dated to about 1945.

It was added to the National Register of Historic Places in 1997.

References

Houses on the National Register of Historic Places in South Carolina
Farms on the National Register of Historic Places in South Carolina
Houses completed in 1900
Houses in Saluda County, South Carolina
National Register of Historic Places in Saluda County, South Carolina